Princess Megan Ategbayon Ibini-Isei (born 31 January 2000), known as Princess Ibini, is an Australian professional soccer player who plays as a forward for Sydney FC.

Early life
Ibini was born in Sydney to Nigerian migrant parents Ibi and Juliana. Her father died suddenly in 2013. She is the younger sister of Australia national soccer team player Bernie Ibini-Isei who plays for Newcastle Jets. She has represented NSW at youth level and has also played futsal for the Inner West Magic.

Ibini is one of four children. She has two older brothers, Bernie and Joshua, as well as one younger brother Pharrell. She has previously stated her eldest brother Bernie is the reason she started playing football. She attended Westfields Sports High School along with fellow Matildas teammate Ellie Carpenter.

Career

Sydney FC
Ibini was a part of the Football NSW Institute program and also represented Illawarra United Stingrays in the Women's National Premier League. Having trained with the Sydney FC since she was 12 years old, Ibini made her debut with the team at just 15 years of age. She was nominated as the NAB Young Footballer of the Month for January 2016.

International
Ibini has represented Australia at multiple levels, starting with the U17 side in 2014. In 2015, she was included in her first training camp for the Matildas. On 27 July 2017, she made her debut for the senior team.

International goals

Honors

Club
 W-League Championship: 2018–19

International
Australia
 Tournament of Nations: 2017

References

External links
 Sydney FC player profile

2000 births
Living people
Women's association football forwards
A-League Women players
Sydney FC (A-League Women) players
Soccer players from Sydney
Australian people of Nigerian descent
Sportspeople of Nigerian descent
Australian women's soccer players
Australia women's international soccer players
People educated at Westfields Sports High School